Still Loving It is an English language song performed by Swedish singer Eric Saade. It taken from Saade's second album, Saade Vol. 1, and was first released on 14 January 2011 in Sweden.

Track listings

Release history

References

2011 singles
Eric Saade songs
2011 songs
Songs written by Anton Hård af Segerstad
Songs written by Eric Saade
Roxy Recordings singles